GNet is a simple network library. It is written in C, object-oriented, and built upon GLib. It is intended to be small, fast, easy-to-use,
and easy to port. The interface is similar to the interface for Java's network library.

GNet has been ported to Linux, BSD, macOS, Solaris, HP-UX, and Windows. It may work on other flavors of Unix too.

According to the GNet reference below, 
GNet is very soon (with the release of GLib 2.22.0) going to be deprecated and replaced by the newly added platform-independent network and socket abstraction layer in GLib/Gio

GNet Features
 TCP "client" and "server" sockets.
 UDP and IP Multicast sockets.
 High-level TCP connection and server objects.
 GConnHttp - HTTP connection object.
 Asynchronous socket IO.
 Internet address abstraction.
 Asynchronous DNS lookup.
 IPv4 and IPv6 support.
 Byte packing and unpacking.
 URI parsing.
 SHA-1 and MD5 hashes.
 Base64 encoding and decoding.
 SOCKS support.

Applications that use GNet
 eDonkey2000 - eDonkey2000 GTK GUI (DFS) frontend
 Gnome Chinese Checkers - board game
 Gnome Jabber - instant messaging and chat
 gtermix - telnet client for BBSes
 Jungle Monkey - distributed file sharing program
 Mail Notify - mail notification applet
 MSI - multi-simulation interface
 Pan - Gnome Newsreader
 PreViking - telephony middleware
 Sussen - network scanner
 Workrave - rest break reminder

External links
 GNet Official site
GNetWorld
 GIO Official site

,
Free computer libraries